The International Astronautical Federation (IAF) is an international space advocacy organization based in Paris, and founded in 1951 as a non-governmental organization to establish a dialogue between scientists around the world and to lay the information for international space cooperation. It has over 390 members from 68 countries across the world. They are drawn from space agencies, companies, universities, professional associations, museums, government organizations and learned societies. The IAF organizes the annual International Astronautical Congress (IAC). As of 2019, Pascale Ehrenfreund has served as the president of the IAF.

History 
After World War II, Heinz Gartmann, Gunter Loeser, and Heinz-Hermann Koelle formed the German Rocket Society. They contacted the British Interplanetary Society (BIS) and Groupement Astronautique Français. The French group's leader, Alexandre Ananoff, organized the First International Congress for Astronautics in Paris, France, in September 1950. At the second congress in London, United Kingdom, in September 1951, the International Astronautical Federation (IAF) was organized; at the third congress in Stuttgart, West Germany, in 1952, the IAF constitution was adopted and the organization registered under Swiss Law.

Events

International Astronautical Federation Congress (IAC) 
The IAC is a space event and the largest put on by the organization, with approximately 6,000 participants each year. A different member of IAF is selected by IAF each year to host the IAC. An annual event held in September or October, the congress includes "networking events, talks, and a technical program on advances in science and exploration, applications and operations, technology, infrastructure, and space and society." There are side events including the annual IAF Workshop with the support of the United Nations,[1] which takes place during the 2 days preceding the IAC.

IAF Global Conference 
The IAF Global Conferences are organized annually. Each year they have a specific space-related topic and theme, and are held in alternating or new locations.

 Global Lunar Exploration Conference (GLUC 2010) in Beijing
 Global Space Exploration Conference (GLEX 2012) in Washington, D.C.
 Global Space Applications Conference (GLAC 2014) in Paris 
 Global Space Innovation Conference (GLIC 2015) in Munich
 Global Conference on Space and the Information Society (GLIS 2016) in Geneva
 Global Space Exploration Conference (GLEX 2017) in Beijing

 Global Space Applications Conference (GLAC 2018) in Montevideo
 Global Conference on Space for Emerging Countries (GLEC 2019) in Marrakech
 Global Space Exploration Conference (GLEX 2021) in St. Petersburg

The International Space Forum at Ministerial Level (ISF) 
The International Space Forum at Ministerial Level (ISF) is an event held by the organization.

The event was founded by the IAF Vice President for Science and Academic Relations in 2015. The gathering pushes discussion on the involvement of universities into space activities, and includes university ministers and delegates from space agencies and other international organizations. Keynote speakers focus on the event's selected theme for the year.

 2016 International Space Forum at Ministerial Level – ISF Trento
 2017 International Space Forum at Ministerial Level, the African Chapter – ISF Nairobi
 2018 International Space Forum at Ministerial Level, the Latin American and Caribbean Chapter – ISF Buenos Aires
 2019 International Space Forum at Ministerial Level – the Mediterranean Chapter – ISF Reggio Calabria

Other 
 IAF Spring Meetings  - The IAF Spring Meetings gather every year in March the IAF community in Paris. For three days, IAF Administrative and Technical Committees meet and the International Programme Committee selects the abstracts to be presented during the year’s IAC.
 IAF International Meeting for Members of Parliament  - annual meeting for members of parliaments, it acts as an informal forum to discuss space matters. Lasting one day, the events has a keynote speech, and all politicians are allowed to make statements on their home country's developments.
 The IAF Workshop  - Organized with the United Nations Office for Outer Space Affairs (UNOOSA), this event "provides space emerging countries with capacity building opportunities in using space science, technologies, applications and exploration in support of sustainable economic, social and environmental development and on the role of industry".

Awards 
The IAF runs two large-scale awards schemes for young professionals and students: The Emerging Space Leaders (ESL) Grants, and the Young Space Leaders Recognition (YSL) Programme. This allows young people to attend the IAC free of charge, and have their travel, accommodation and costs paid whilst there.

Every year at the International Astronautical Congress, awards are given out: The main awards are the IAF World Space Award, the Allan D. Emil Memorial Award, the IAF Hall of Fame, the IAF Distinguished Service Award, the Franck J. Malina Astronautics Medal, the Luigi G. Napolitano Award, the AAAF Medals and the Hermann Oberth Medals.

World Space Award 
The World Space Award is designated by the IAF as its "most prestigious award" and as the organization's premier accolade, it is often described as the "world's highest aerospace award." The award is presented to an eminent individual or team at the IAC Congress, after an nomination process, that has made an "exceptional impact to the progress of the world space activities" by their outstanding contributions in the fields of space science, technology, medicine, law, or management.

Frank J. Malina Astronautics Medal 
The Frank J. Malina Astronautics Medal is presented every year at the Congress of the IAF. The medal is presented annually, commencing in 1986, to an educator who has demonstrated excellence in taking the fullest advantage of the resources available to him/her to promote the study of astronautics and related space sciences.

The Frank J. Malina Award consists of the Malina commemorative medal and a certificate of citation, presented at the International Astronautical Federation Awards Banquet. The funding for the medal is by the Aerojet-General Corporation and administration for the medal done through the American Institute of Aeronautics and Astronautics (AIAA).

Publications 
The IAF publishes proceedings from its meeting electronically, along with studies undertaken by IAF committees, and other reports.

See also 

 Manfred Lachs

References

External links 
 
 International Astronautical Congress 2013
 International Institute of Space Law

1951 establishments in France
Organizations based in Paris
Organizations established in 1951
Space advocacy organizations